Tuscumbia is a ghost town in Bernadotte Township, Fulton County, Illinois, US, that sprang up in the township and was platted by Wade Hampton on 2 March 1837. It consisted of 54 lots. It flourished for a while and had a school, but by 1855 was abandoned. 

A sign on County Road 14, known as the Bernadotte blacktop, nine miles west of Lewistown, Illinois, is the only remnant.

History
Illinois was experiencing rapid settlement during the early 1800s. The timeframe of Tuscumbia coincides with Abraham Lincoln's career. In 1838, Lincoln visited the county seat Lewistown nine miles east of the Tuscumbia area, extending the range of his law practice.

References

Further reading
 A RAMBLER’S NOTES  Lewistown Township,  Kate Perry, Canton Weekly Register, January 11, 1906
 Heylin, Jesse, ed. History of Fulton County Chicago: Munsell Publishing Co, 1908
 Gannett, Henry,  American Names:  A guide to the origin of place names in the US (Washington: Public Affairs Press, 1947)
 Adams, James, A List of Illinois Place Names, Illinois Libraries, Vol 50 nos 4,5,6 1968

See also
 Ghost Towns

Geography of Fulton County, Illinois
Ghost towns in Illinois
Populated places established in 1837